Georges Van Coningsloo (27 October 1940 – 7 April 2002) was a Belgian racing cyclist.

Career
Van Coningsloo was a professional from 1963 to 1974. In 1967, he won Bordeaux–Paris, after a 370 kilometer breakaway. 

He rode in four Grand Tours in his career: three editions of the Tour de France, and the 1970 Vuelta a España, but failed to finish all of the races.

His son Philippe was also a high level cyclist. He died, however, before turning professional, after suffering a heart attack during a race. In his honor, a race called the Memorial Philippe Van Coningsloo is held in July. His other son, Olivier, was also a professional cyclist, who rode for two seasons before ending his career.

Major results

1958
 1st Overall Liège–La Gleize
1963
 4th La Flèche Wallonne
 10th Liège–Bastogne–Liège
1964
 1st Paris–Brussels
 2nd Liège–Bastogne–Liège
 5th Tour of Flanders
 5th Milan–San Remo
 5th Rund um den Henninger Turm
1965
 1st Ronde van Limburg
 1st Grand Prix de Fourmies
 1st Stage 8 Paris–Nice
 1st Stage 7 Critérium du Dauphiné Libéré
 1st Stage 1 Tour of Belgium
 2nd E3 Prijs Vlaanderen
 2nd Brabantse Pijl
 3rd Rund um den Henninger Turm
 5th La Flèche Wallonne
 10th Paris–Roubaix
1966
 5th Overall Tour of Belgium
 9th La Flèche Wallonne
1967
 1st Bordeaux–Paris
 2nd Overall Tour de Wallonie
 2nd Overall Paris–Luxembourg
 3rd Rund um den Henninger Turm
 5th Milan–San Remo
1968
 4th Overall Tour de l'Oise
1969
 1st Stage 2B Tour de l'Oise
 2nd E3 Prijs Vlaanderen
 4th Bordeaux–Paris
 7th Paris–Tours
 8th Milan–San Remo
 9th Overall Tour de Luxembourg
1970
 2nd Ronde van Limburg
1971
 1st Grand Prix Pino Cerami
 4th Tour of Flanders
 6th Brabantse Pijl
1972
 1st Flèche Hesbignonne
1973
 2nd Flèche Hesbignonne

References

External links
 

1940 births
2002 deaths
Belgian male cyclists